Yellow flax is a common name for several plants in the flax family (Linaceae) and may refer to:

 Linum flavum, native to central and southern Europe
 Linum sulcatum, grooved yellow flax, native to eastern North America
 Reinwardtia indica, native to the Himalayas